Michel Constantin (born Constantin Hokhloff, 13 July 1924 – 29 August 2003) was a French film actor.

Biography
Born to a Russian father and a Polish mother in Billancourt (near Paris), Constantin  made his first film appearance in 1956.  His first credited role was in the prison breakout drama Le Trou (aka The Hole) in 1960.

Selected filmography 

 Plucking the Daisy (1956) - Un spectateur du strip-tease (uncredited)
 The Hole (Le Trou) (1960) - Jo Cassine
 A Man Named Rocca (1961) - Le chef des racketteurs américains
 The Law of Men (1962) - Paulo
 Maigret Sees Red (1963) - Cicero
 The Gorillas (1964) - Otto, le légionnaire (uncredited)
 The Wise Guys (Les Grandes Gueules) (1965) - Skida
  (1966) - Jeff
 Le deuxième souffle (1966) - Alban
 Dirty Heroes (Dalle Ardenne all'inferno) (1967) - Sgt Rudolph Petrowsky
  (1967) - Stan
 Jerk à Istambul (1967) - Vincent
  (1967) - Georges
 The Southern Star (1969) - Jose
  (1969) - Chamoun
 A Very Curious Girl (La Fiancée du pirate) (1969) - André
 L'ardoise (1970) - Théo Gilani
 Last Known Address (Dernier domicile connu) (1970) - Greg
 Children of Mata Hari (La Peau de Torpedo) (1970) - Coster
  (1970) - René
 Violent City (1970) - Killain
 The Cop (Un condé) (1970) - Viletti
 Cold Sweat (1970) - Whitey
  (1971) - Michel
 The Lion's Share (1971) - Inspecteur Michel Grazzi
  (1972) - Commissaire Campana
  (1972) - Weiss
 La Scoumoune (1972) - Xavier Saratov
 The Outside Man (Un homme est mort) (1972) - Antoine
  (1973) - Marius Fantoni 'Fanto'
 Le mataf (1973) - Bernard Solville
 Special Killers (1973) - Inspector Palma
  (1973) - Capt. Augier
  (1974) - Mario (uncredited)
 Un linceul n'a pas de poches (1974) - Culi
 The Beast (Il bestione) (1974) - Sandro Colautti
 La guerre du pétrole n'aura pas lieu (1975, writer)
 The Track (1975) - Capitaine Nimier
  (1975) - Guilloux
 Sahara Cross (1977)
 The Inglorious Bastards (Quel maledetto treno blindato) (1978) - Veronique
 Ça fait tilt (1978) - Raymond Legris
 Plein les poches pour pas un rond... (1978) - Steff, le taxi
 Signé Furax (1981) - Grougnache
 Cappotto di legno (1981) - Don Vincenzo Talascio
  (1982) - Alexandre Gagnon
 Deux heures moins le quart avant Jésus-Christ (1982) - Le secutor
 Ronde de nuit (1984) - L'instructeur de stand de tir (voice)
 Les Morfalous (1984) - Adjudant Édouard Mahuzard
 Le téléphone sonne toujours deux fois!! (1985) - Le directeur du cinéma
 La baston (1985) - Raoul
 La loi sauvage (1988) - Victor
 Ville à vendre (1992) - Docteur Bernier

References

External links

1924 births
2003 deaths
French people of Russian descent
French people of Polish descent
Deaths from cancer in France
People from Boulogne-Billancourt
French male film actors
French male television actors